Joachim Township is an inactive township in Jefferson County, in the U.S. state of Missouri.

Joachim Township was established in 1818.

References

Townships in Missouri
Townships in Jefferson County, Missouri